Didier Rabat (born 2 August 1966) is a French former footballer who is last known to have played as a midfielder for Toulon.

Career

In 1985, Rabat signed for Limoges in the French second division after playing for the reserves of French Ligue 1 side Monaco.

In 1988, he was sent on loan to Laval in the French second division from PSG, one of France's most successful clubs, where he suffered a torn ligament injury.

In 1990, Rabat signed for Pau in the French third division.

In 1995, he signed for French second division team Toulon, before joining Notts County in the English lower leagues.

References

External links
 

Living people
French footballers
Expatriate footballers in England
Notts County F.C. players
French expatriate footballers
Ligue 2 players
Lyon La Duchère players
Stade Lavallois players
Limoges FC players
Pau FC players
Paris Saint-Germain F.C. players
Ligue 1 players
Association football midfielders
SC Toulon players
French expatriate sportspeople in England
1966 births